Andrei Vițelaru (born 3 February 1985) is a Romanian footballer who plays as a defender for Ozana Târgu Neamț.

References

External links
 
 

1985 births
Living people
Romanian footballers
Association football defenders
Liga I players
CSM Ceahlăul Piatra Neamț players
Liga II players
LPS HD Clinceni players
ACS Foresta Suceava players
Lebanese Premier League players
Racing Club Beirut players
Romanian expatriate footballers
Romanian expatriate sportspeople in Lebanon
Expatriate footballers in Lebanon
Sportspeople from Piatra Neamț